Pandanus multispicatus (Vakwa de Montanny) is a species of plant in the family Pandanaceae, one of several Pandanus species that are endemic to the Seychelles.

Description
This is the only Pandanus of Seychelles that does not become a tree, but rather grows as a low (max 4 meters high), sprawling shrub, the thin stems often lying decumbent along the ground. 
The fruit bodies resemble corn cobs. Each contains 200-400 individual fruit segments, and several fruit bodies are born together on a stalk.

Distribution and habitat
It grows mainly in rocky areas and was previously very common in the higher mountains of Seychelles (the reason for its local name, "Vakwa de Montanny"). Formerly widespread, it is currently restricted to only eight small and isolated populations.

Other indigenous Pandanus of the Seychelles include Pandanus sechellarum, Pandanus hornei and Pandanus balfourii. The Madagascan species Pandanus utilis is introduced and is now also widespread.

References

Flora of Seychelles
multispicatus
Vulnerable plants
Endemic flora of Seychelles
Taxonomy articles created by Polbot
Taxa named by Isaac Bayley Balfour